Albert Reeves may refer to:

 Albert L. Reeves Jr. (1906–1987), U.S. Representative from Missouri
 Albert L. Reeves (1873–1971), US federal judge